Jan Maraea Khan (born 25 April 1958 in Rotorua, New Zealand) is an international lawn bowls competitor for New Zealand.

Personal life
Jan is of Pakistani descent through her father, and of Yugoslav and Maori descent through her mother. Both she and her sister Marina Khan are the daughters of lawn bowler Millie Khan.

Bowls career
At the 2002 Commonwealth Games she won a bronze medal in the women's fours event. At the 2006 Commonwealth Games she again won a bronze in the women's pairs event with her sister Marina Khan.

She has won five medals at the Asia Pacific Bowls Championships, of which three have been gold medals.

Khan won the 2010 singles title and the 1997, 2000 & 2001 fours title at the New Zealand National Bowls Championships when bowling for the Beckenham Bowls Club.

References

Living people
1958 births
New Zealand female bowls players
Commonwealth Games bronze medallists for New Zealand
Bowls players at the 2002 Commonwealth Games
Bowls players at the 2006 Commonwealth Games
Sportspeople from Rotorua
New Zealand people of Pakistani descent
New Zealand people of Yugoslav descent
New Zealand Māori sportspeople
Bowls World Champions
Commonwealth Games medallists in lawn bowls
Medallists at the 2002 Commonwealth Games
Medallists at the 2006 Commonwealth Games